Thirsk Town was a railway station that briefly served passengers for Thirsk, North Yorkshire, England in the 1840s and 1850s. It was closed to passengers in 1855 but continued in freight use until October 1966. Trains could leave the site only south-eastwards onto the Leeds Northern Railway towards Ripon, but a reversal was possible into Thirsk railway station after crossing the main line between York and Darlington.

History
The station was opened with the line in January 1848 and initially only served freight traffic with passenger trains starting in June of the same year. Passenger trains continued to use the station for seven years until all workings were diverted to serve Thirsk railway station (on the York, Newcastle and Berwick Railway) leaving only freight trains serving Thirsk Town terminus.

The station was part of the Leeds and Thirsk Railway, which became the Leeds Northern Railway and in 1854 amalgamated with other companies to form the North Eastern Railway (NER). The NER was grouped into the London and North Eastern Railway in 1923 and became part of the North Eastern Region of British Rail upon Nationalisation in 1948.

The original Leeds and Thirsk line was closed in 1958 and lifted in 1959. The goods station at Thirsk Town stayed open until October 1966 with trains travelling down to Thirsk Town Junction and then reversing northwards for  onto the East Coast Main Line and into Thirsk railway station.

The site was used as an agricultural merchants after closure and was renovated into a supermarket, which still occupies the site.

References

Bibliography

External links
Station on a 1947 navigable map. The line it is on is clearly shown as a freight line

Disused railway stations in North Yorkshire
Railway stations in Great Britain opened in 1848
Railway stations in Great Britain closed in 1855
Former North Eastern Railway (UK) stations
Thirsk